Thul-Nao railway station 
() is  located in Jacobabad District of Sindh, Pakistan. Founded in 1950s, it is one of the two railway stations that serve the area.

See also
 List of railway stations in Pakistan
 Thul Nao (Jacobabad) railway station

References

Further reading
 Upper Sinde Frontier Jacobabad by Momin Bullo

External links

Railway stations in Jacobabad District